"On Another's Sorrow" is a poem by the English poet William Blake. The poem discusses human and divine empathy and compassion. It was published as part of the Songs of Innocence and of Experience in 1789 as the last song in the Songs of Innocence section.

Blake argues that human sympathy is a valuable trait. After making this observation about man he then speaks of the sympathy of God, as well. In his commentary on the poem, D. G. Gillham notes that though Blake discusses the nature of God, he attempts to do so in a rational way without referring to the supernatural.

The poem is one of the few entries in Songs of Innocence and of Experience that contains an explicit declaration of innocence. It is also the only poem in the volume that is in Blake's own voice.

References

Bibliography

External links
"On Another's Sorrow" by William Blake

Songs of Innocence and of Experience